Josef Dobeš (4 July 1904 – 28 September 1985) was a Czech equestrian. He competed in two events at the 1936 Summer Olympics.

References

External links
 

1904 births
1985 deaths
Czech male equestrians
Olympic equestrians of Czechoslovakia
Equestrians at the 1936 Summer Olympics
People from Prague-East District
Sportspeople from the Central Bohemian Region